The 2014-15 season is Raja CA's 65th year in existence, they had a quite successful 2013 - 2014 season where despite not winning any silverware they finished as runners - up in the 2013 FIFA Club World Cup, losing to Bayern Munich of Germany in the final. In addition to this, they finished as runners-up in both of Morocco's domestic competitions. They finished 2nd in Botola Pro after losing on the final day and so finished 3 points behind champions, Moghreb Tetouan. They lost in the Coupe du Trône final 5 - 4 on penalties in the Final to Difaa El Jadida after the first 120 minutes finished level at 0 - 0.
In the CAF Champions League they were knocked out in just the First Round by Horoya AC of Guinea, losing 5 - 4 on penalties after drawing 1 - 1 on aggregate.

Players

First Team Squad

Transfers

In

Out

References

Raja CA seasons